Velupillai Prabhakaran ((26 November 1954 – 18 May 2009) was a Eelam Tamil guerrilla revolutionary. A major figure of Tamil nationalism and the founder and leader of the Liberation Tigers of Tamil Eelam (LTTE), a militant organization that sought to create an independent Tamil state in the north and east of Sri Lanka, due to the oppression of Sri Lankan Tamils by the Sri Lankan Government. The LTTE waged war in Sri Lanka for more than 25 years, to create an independent state for the Sri Lankan Tamil people.

Prabhakaran was the youngest of four children, born in Valvettithurai, on Sri Lanka's Jaffna peninsula's northern coast. Considered the heart of Tamil culture and literature in Sri Lanka, Jaffna was concentrated with growing Tamil nationalism, which called for autonomy for Tamils to protest the discrimination against them by the Sinhalese-dominated Sri Lanka government and Sinhalese civilians since Sri Lanka gained independence from Britain in 1948.

Founded in 1976, the LTTE came to prominence in 1983 after it ambushed a patrol of the Sri Lanka Army outside Jaffna, resulting in the deaths of 13 soldiers. This ambush, along with the subsequent pogrom that resulted in the deaths of thousands of Tamil civilians, is generally considered the start of the Sri Lankan Civil War. After years of fighting, including the intervention of the Indian Army (IPKF), the conflict was halted after international mediation in 2001. By then, the LTTE, which came to be known as the Tamil Tigers, controlled large swathes of land in the north and east of the country, running a de facto state with Prabhakaran as its leader. Peace talks eventually broke down, and the Sri Lanka Army launched a military campaign to defeat the LTTE in 2006.

Prabhakaran, who had said, "I would prefer to die in honour rather than being caught alive by the enemy", was killed in fighting with the Sri Lankan Army in May 2009. His son Charles Anthony was also killed in fighting with the Sri Lankan Army, and his wife's and daughter's bodies were reportedly found by the Sri Lankan army; the Sri Lankan government later denied the report. His 12-year-old second son was executed a short time later. Prabhakaran's reported death and the announcement "We have decided to silence our guns. Our only regrets are for the lives lost and that we could not hold out for longer" by Selvarasa Pathmanathan, the Tigers' chief of international relations, brought an end to the armed conflict.

A significant figure of Sri Lankan Tamil nationalism, Prabhakaran is often seen as a martyr by Sri Lankan Tamils, but critics have noted that he created one of the most ruthless and sophisticated insurgencies, with many of the tactics he pioneered influencing political militant groups globally. Prabhakaran argued that he chose military means only after observing that nonviolent means were ineffectual and obsolete, especially after Tamil Eelam revolutionary Thileepan's fatal hunger strike in 1987 had no effect. Influenced by prominent Indian nationalists Subhas Chandra Bose and Bhagat Singh, who fought the British Empire, Prabhakaran declared that his goal was 'revolutionary socialism and the creation of an egalitarian society'.

Early life
Velupillai Prabhakaran was born in the northern coastal town of Valvettithurai on 26 November 1954, the youngest of four children, to Thiruvenkadam Velupillai and his wife Vallipuram Parvathy. Thiruvenkadam Velupillai was the District land Officer in the Ceylon Government. He came from an influential and wealthy family who owned and managed the major Hindu temples in Valvettithurai.

Angered by the discrimination and violent persecution against Tamil people by successive Sri Lankan governments, Prabhakaran joined the student group Tamil Youth Front (TYF) during the standardisation debates. In 1972, he founded the Tamil New Tigers (TNT), a successor to many earlier organizations that protested against the post-colonial political direction of the country, in which the minority Sri Lankan Tamils were pitted against the majority Sinhalese people.

In 1975, after becoming heavily involved in the Tamil movement, he carried out the first major political assassination by a Tamil group, killing Alfred Duraiappah, the mayor of Jaffna, shooting him at point-blank range when he was about to enter the Hindu temple at Ponnaalai. The assassination was in response to the killings of Tamils in the 1974 Tamil conference incident, for which Duraiappah was to be blamed for because he backed the then-ruling Sri Lanka Freedom Party.

Liberation Tigers of Tamil Eelam

Founding of the LTTE
In the early 1970s, United Front government of Sirimavo Bandaranaike introduced the Policy of standardisation which made the criteria for university admission lower for the Sinhalese than for the Tamils. Several organizations to counter this act was formed by Tamil students. Prabhakaran aged 15, dropped out of school and got associated with the Kuttimani-Thangathurai group (which evolved later into TELO) formed by Selvarajah Yogachandran (known as Kuttimani) and Nadarajah Thangathurai who both also hailed from Valvettithurai.

Prabhakaran along with Kuttimani, Ponnuthurai Sivakumaran and other prominent rebels joined the Tamil Manavar Peravai formed by a student named Satiyaseelan in 1970. This group comprised Tamil youth who advocated the rights of students to have fair enrollment. In 1973, Prabhakaran teamed up with Chetti Thanabalasingam and with a fraction of the Tamil Manavar Peravai to form the Tamil New Tigers (TNT). Their first notable attack was held at the Duraiappa stadium in Jaffna placing a bomb in an attempt to murder the Jaffna Mayor Alfred Duraiappah. A member of the Sri Lanka Freedom Party who was loyal to Sirimavo Bandaranaike, Duraiappah was seen as a traitor by the Tamil masses. Failing the attempt, Prabhakaran managed to shoot and kill Duraiappah who was on a visit at a Hindu temple at Ponnalai on 27 July 1975.

On 5 May 1976, the TNT was renamed the Liberation Tigers of Tamil Eelam (LTTE), commonly known as the Tamil Tigers.

Eelam War I 
The LTTE by the 1980s operated in more attacks against police and military forces. On 23 July 1983, the LTTE ambushed an army patrol and killed 13 Sri Lankan soldiers in Thirunelveli, Sri Lanka. As a response to this were one of the worst government sponsored anti-Tamil riots held (the event known as Black July) resulting in the destruction of Tamil houses and shops and death of hundreds of Tamils and making over 150 000 Tamils homeless.
As a result of the riots were several Tamils joining the LTTE and the LTTE marked the beginning of the Eelam War I. With Prabhakaran being the most wanted man in Sri Lanka, he had said in 1984, “I would prefer to die in honour rather than being caught alive by the enemy.” Prabhakaran held his first speech on 4 August 1987 at the Suthumalai Amman temple in front of over 100 000 people explaining the position of the LTTE. This speech is seen as a historic turning point in the Sri Lankan Tamil nationalism. In the same year, Asiaweek compared Prabhakaran to revolutionary Che Guevara, while Newsweek called him "the stuff of legend".

Assassination of Rajiv Gandhi 
The LTTE were allegedly involved in the assassination of Rajiv Gandhi, the ex-prime minister of India in 1991, which they denied involvement and alleged the event as an international conspiracy against them. However, in a 2011 interview, Kumaran Pathmanathan, who was the Treasurer of LTTE and its chief arms procurer, apologized to India for Velupillai Prabhakaran's "mistake" of killing former Prime Minister Rajiv Gandhi. He further said Rajiv's assassination was "well planned and done actually with Prabhakaran and (LTTE intelligence chief Pottu Amman). Everyone knows the truth". The TADA Court issued an arrest warrant for plotting of the assassination of Rajiv Gandhi. In October 2010 the charges against Prabhakaran  were dropped by the TADA Court after the Central Bureau of Investigation filed a report stating that he was dead and the case was closed.

Peace talks 
Prabhakaran's first and only major press conference was held in Killinochchi on 10 April 2002.  It was reported that more than 200 journalists from the local and foreign media attended this event and they had to go through a 10-hour security screening before the event in which Anton Balasingham introduced the LTTE leader as the "President and Prime Minister of Tamil Eelam." A number of questions were asked about LTTE's commitment towards the erstwhile peace process and Prabhakaran and Dr. Anton Balasingham jointly answered the questions. Repeated questions about his involvement in the Rajiv Gandhi assassination were only answered in a sober note by both Balasingham and Prabhakaran. They called it a "tragic incident" ("Thunbiyal Chambavam", as quoted in Tamil) they requested the press "not to dig into an incident that happened 10 years ago."

During the interview, he stated that the right condition has not risen to give up the demand of Tamil Eelam. He further mentioned that "There are three fundamentals. That is Tamil homeland, Tamil nationality and Tamil right to self-determination. These are the fundamental demands of the Tamil people. Once these demands are accepted or a political solution is put forward by recognising these three fundamentals and our people are satisfied with the solutions we will consider giving up the demand for Eelam." He further added that Tamil Eelam was not only the demand of the LTTE but also the demand of the Tamil people.

Prabhakaran also answered a number of questions in which he reaffirmed their commitment towards the peace process, quoted "We are sincerely committed to the peace process. It is because we are sincerely committed to peace that we continued a four month cessation of hostilities" was also firm in de-proscription of the LTTE by Sri Lanka and India, "We want the government of India to lift the ban on the LTTE. We will raise the issue at the appropriate time."

Prabhakaran also insisted firmly that only de-proscription would bring forth an amenable solution to the ongoing peace process mediated by Norway: "We have informed the government, we have told the Norwegians that de-proscription is a necessary condition for the commencements of talks."

Sri Lankan Army Northern offensive and death 
When the Sri Lankan military rapidly advanced into the last LTTE held territory in the final days of 2008–2009 SLA Northern offensive, Prabhakaran and his top leadership retreated into Vellamullivaikkal, Mullaitivu. Fierce fighting occurred between LTTE and the Sri Lanka Army during these last few days. At around 3:00 a.m. on 18 May 2009, Prabhakaran's son Charles Anthony tried to break the defenses of the Army, but was unsuccessful. He died along with around 100 other LTTE fighters. Troops found 12 million rupees in his possession. By noon that day, reports emerged that Prabhakaran was killed by a rocket attack while trying to flee the conflict zone in a captured ambulance and his body was badly burned. But this rumour was proven false in a short while. Skirmishes occurred also in the evening of 18 May around eastern bank of Nandikadal lagoon. A team of LTTE cadres consisting of 30 most loyal bodyguards of Prabhakaran and Prabhakaran himself tried to sneak through the mangrove islands of Nandikadal to its west bank. It has been alleged that one bodyguard had a can of gasoline with him to burn the Tiger leader's body if he was killed or committed suicide. This was to prevent the enemy seizing his body. Clearing and mopping-up operations were carried out by troops under Colonel G. V. Ravipriya from 3:30 pm to 6:30 pm that evening, but they did not encounter this last group of LTTE fighters that day. At 7:30 am next morning, mopping-up operations started again. This time, they were confronted by the fighters, led by Prabhakaran himself. Fighting went on until 9:30 am 19 May 2009. The firing stopped as all LTTE fighters died in the battle. Troops started collecting bodies again. This time, Sergeant Muthu Banda, attached to Sri Lanka Army Task Force VIII, reported to Ravipriya that a body similar to Prabhakaran's had been found. After the body, which was floating among the mangroves, was brought ashore, Colonel Ravipriya positively identified it as that of the leader of the LTTE. A dog tag marked 001, two pistols, a T56 rifle with telescopic sight, a satellite phone, and a canister filled with diabetic medicine were found along with the body.

At 12:15 pm army commander Sarath Fonseka officially announced Prabhakaran's death on TV. At around 1:00 pm his body was shown in Swarnavahini for the first time. Prabakaran's identity was confirmed by Karuna Amman, his former confidant, and through DNA testing against genetic material from his son, who had been killed earlier by the Sri Lankan military. Circumstantial evidence suggested that his death was caused by massive head trauma, several claims on his death have been made and its alleged that his death is due to a shot at close range. There are also allegations that he was executed, a claim vehemently denied by Sri Lankan authorities. Karuna Amman claimed Prabhakaran shot himself but it was denied by Fonseka who claimed the injury was from shrapnel citing the lack of an exit wound. A week later, the new Tamil Tiger leader, Selvarasa Pathmanathan, admitted that Prabhakaran was dead.

Alleged claims of survival
Despite the announcement of his death by both the Government and LTTE remnants, certain groups and media have claimed that Prabhakaran survived the war and managed to escape. In 2009 a Tamil website showed an image showing Prabhakaran viewing a news report of his death in TV which was sent to France 24 as proof of his survival. But France 24 noted that the photo appeared to be photoshopped. In 2010 Pro-LTTE website TamilWin claimed that the body of Prabhakaran shown belonged to a Sri Lankan soldier showing images of a Prabhakaran look-alike in the Sri Lankan army. The theory of Prabhakaran's survival is also supported by Tamil Nadu politician Vaiko who claims Prabhakaran would emerge from hiding at the right time. The claim of Prabhakaran's survival was reiterated in 2023 by Indian activist Pazha Nedumara, who declared through a press conference held at Thanjavur that the slain leader of LTTE is "still alive and doing well" and that he has been in contact with Prabhakaran's family. The claim was rejected by Sri Lanka which issued a statement stating that Prabhakaran's corpse had been confirmed by his close associates as well as DNA testing.

Philosophy and ideology
Prabhakaran was influenced by prominent Indian nationalists Subhas Chandra Bose and Bhagat Singh, who fought the British Empire. Prabhakaran never developed a systematic philosophy, but did declare that his goal was 'revolutionary socialism and the creation of an egalitarian society'. His rare interviews, his annual Tamil Eelam Heroes Day speeches and the LTTE's policies and actions can be taken as indicators of Prabhakaran's philosophy and ideology. Religion was not a major factor in his philosophy or ideology; the Tamil Tigers' ideology emerged from Marxist-Leninist thought and was explicitly secular. Its leadership professed opposition to religion. It focused single-mindedly on attaining an independent Tamil Eelam. The following are important aspects of Prabhakaran's philosophy and ideology:

Sri Lankan Tamil nationalism
Prabhakaran is often seen as a martyr to the Sri Lankan Tamil people. His source of inspiration and direction was Sri Lankan Tamil nationalism, and his stated and ultimate ideal was to get Tamil Eelam recognised as a nation as per the U.N. Charter that guarantees the right of a people to political independence. The LTTE also proposed the formation of an Interim Self Governing Authority during Peace Negotiations in 2003. Former Tamil guerrilla and politician Dharmalingam Sithadthan has remarked that Prabhakaran's "dedication to the cause of the Tamil Eelam was unquestionable, he was the only man in Sri Lanka who could decide if there should be war or peace."

Militarism of the LTTE
Prabhakaran explicitly stated that an armed struggle is the only way to resist asymmetric warfare, in which one side, that of the Sri Lankan government, is armed and the other comparatively unarmed. He argued that he chose military means only after observing that non–violent means have been ineffectual and obsolete, especially after the Thileepan incident. Thileepan, a Lt. colonel rank officer adopted Gandhian means to protest against the IPKF killings by staging a fast unto death from 15 September 1987, and by abstaining from food or water until 26 September, when he died in front of thousands of Tamils who had come there to fast along with him.

Tactically, Prabhakaran perfected the recruitment and use of suicide bomber units. His fighters usually took no prisoners and were notorious for assaults that often left every single enemy soldier dead. Interpol described him as someone who was "very alert, known to use disguise and capable of handling sophisticated weaponry and explosives." He was called as "military genius" by western military experts.

Personal life
Prabhakaran was married to Mathivathani Erambu on 1 October 1984. The military spokesman Udaya Nanayakkara said in May 2009 that there was no information about the whereabouts of the remaining members of Prabhakaran's family. "We have not found their bodies and have no information about them," he said. It is thought that the entire family was wiped out; the bodies of Mathivathani, Duvaraga and Balachandran reportedly were found in a bushy patch about 600 meters away from where Prabhakaran's body was found. It is now alleged that his 12-year-old son was executed.

Prabhakaran's parents, Thiruvenkadam Velupillai and Parvathi, both in their 70s, were found in the Menik Farm camp for displaced people near the town of Vavuniya. The Sri Lankan military and the government gave public assurances that they would not be interrogated, harmed or ill-treated. They were taken into Sri Lankan military custody until Vellupillai's death in January 2010. Prabhakaran has a sister, Vinodini Rajendaran.

Other names
Prabhakaran had over the years built up the LTTE into a powerful movement running a shadow state and had acquired the status of being “Thesiya Thalaivar” (leader of the land). He was called thambi, meaning younger brother, by Sri Lankan Tamil elders. which was also his pet name since he was the youngest in his family. He was also called as Anna/Annai, meaning 'elder brother' by his younger cadets and the younger Sri Lankan Tamil people. Prabhakaran was also called "Karikalan" for his bravery and his administration (in reference to Karikala Chola, a famous Chola king who ruled in Sangam Age.) He was also raised to divine status as “Sooriyathevan” (God of the Sun) by his followers.

See also
 LTTE Commanders
 Nadarajah Thangathurai
 Ponnuthurai Sivakumaran
 Selvarajah Yogachandran

Notes

References

Further reading
 Rajan Hoole. (2001) The Arrogance of power, UTHR (J), Colombo.
 Pratap, Anita. Island of Blood: Frontline Reports From Sri Lanka, Afghanistan and Other South Asian Flashpoints (2001).

External links
 United States Pacific Command Assessment of Prabhakaran
 BBC Profile – The enigma of Prabhakaran
 BBC News Report – Reclusive Tamil rebel leader faces public (2002)
 The Pirabaharan Phenomenon
 Final Showdown for Tamil Tiger Chief Prabhakaran The Times of India, 23 April 2009
 Claims of Massacre as Tamil Tiger Leaders Die by Robert Bosleigh, The Times, 19 May 2009

Interviews and speeches
 
 
 Prabakaran in First Person – T.S. Subramanian – April 2002 – Press Meet

1954 births
2009 deaths

Deaths by firearm in Sri Lanka
Fugitives wanted by Sri Lanka
Liberation Tigers of Tamil Eelam members
Sri Lankan Christians
Sri Lankan revolutionaries
Sri Lankan Tamil rebels
Tamil Eelam
Assassination of Rajiv Gandhi
Indian Peace Keeping Force